McGeehan may refer to :

Charles McGeehan (1878–1933), American college sports coach
Jessie M. McGeehan (1872–1950), Scottish artist
John McGeehan, British microbiologist
John E. McGeehan (1880–1968), American jurist, Justice of the New York Supreme Court, 1933-50
Mark McGeehan, USAF pilot that died in 1994 Fairchild Air Force Base B-52 crash
Mary Kate McGeehan, American actress
W. O. McGeehan (1879–1933), American sportswriter and editor of the New York Herald Tribune